Jeananne is a feminine given name. Notable people with the name include:

Jeananne Crowley (born 1949),  Irish actress and writer
Jeananne Goossen (born 1985), Canadian actress

See also
Jeanine

Feminine given names